Theater of the Mind is the sixth studio album by American hip hop recording artist Ludacris. It was released in the UK on November 21, 2008 and in the US on November 24, 2008 and on other release dates throughout the world, through Disturbing tha Peace and Def Jam South. Ludacris calls the album "theatrical".

Background
The album was slated for release on October 21, but was pushed back to November 24. In April 2008, a song named "Let's Stay Together" appeared on xxlmag.com; supposedly from the new album. It is now an iTunes bonus song on the album. T.I. appeared on a track called "Wish You Would", produced by DJ Toomp.

The album cover was released on October 24, 2008 at wemix.com. The cover is an homage to Sly and The Family Stone's Life album, which had the band appearing as all the cinemas goers in the picture. Ludacris planned on releasing a sequel to this album in 2009.

Ludacris has been talking to T.I. and Young Jeezy about a tour together.

Guests
Ludacris stated before the release of the album that, rather than featuring "guests", the tracks would have "co-stars", in keeping with the concept of the album as a "movie". "Co-stars" on Theater of the Mind include Nas, Plies, Jay-Z, T.I., Common, T-Pain, Willy Northpole, Rick Ross, Playaz Circle, Ving Rhames, Chris Rock, Spike Lee, Chris Brown, Sean Garrett, Lil Wayne, Floyd Mayweather Jr., Jamie Foxx, and The Game.

Promotion
Ludacris released a "Gangsta Grillz" mixtape, with DJ Drama, titled The Preview. The mixtape was released as a digital download on July 28, 2008. This mixtape was well known for his disses toward George W. Bush, Hillary Clinton and John McCain.

Leaks
On October 24, 2008, three songs from Theater of the Mind, "Do the Right Thing", featuring Common and Spike Lee, "I Do It for Hip Hop", featuring Jay-Z and Nas, and "Last of a Dying Breed", featuring Lil Wayne were leaked to the Internet. Ludacris commented on the situation:

Singles

Official singles
 The first official single is "What Them Girls Like", featuring Chris Brown & Sean Garrett.  The single peaked at #33 on the Billboard Hot 100.
 The second official single is "One More Drink", featuring T-Pain, peaking at #24 on the Billboard Hot 100.
 The third single is confirmed to be "Nasty Girl", featuring Plies.

Other songs
 The first promo single is "Wish You Would", featuring T.I.
 The second promo single is "Undisputed", featuring Floyd Mayweather Jr.
 The song "Last of a Dying Breed", featuring Lil Wayne, peaked at #65 on the Billboard 100.

Reception

Critical reception

Theater of the Mind garnered a mild reception from music critics. Addi Stewart from NOW praised the cinematic concept throughout the record, from its title to the vast majority of featured artists on every track. Entertainment Weeklys Simon Vozick-Levinson said about the overall feel of the album: "Theater feels a bit like yet another Ocean's Eleven sequel. We've watched this movie more than a few times, but it's always fun to see this many talented pals cutting loose together." Josh Eells of Blender felt the lyrical content making up the whole concept record was lacking and too complacent for Luda, saying that "Punch line for punch line, Luda is still the best in the business, but these sex jams and hater disses feel too flat and perfunctory for his thousand-watt personality." He concluded that after the final track "the whole thing seems less like an album than a branding exercise—an obligatory effort to keep the “hip-hop star” line on his CV." The A.V. Clubs Nathan Rabin commended the upbeat tracks and lyrical collaborations with T-Pain, Nas/Jay-Z and T.I. but felt they were only decent retreads of Luda's previous material and lacked the strengths found in his guest verses on other people's records. He also compared it to Kanye West's 808s & Heartbreak on how it engages its respective fanbases, saying that Mind is "more immediately accessible, but ultimately less resonant" and could benefit from a "radical reinvention" that's similar to Heartbreak. Robert Christgau cited "I Do It for Hip Hop" as a "choice cut", indicating a good song on "an album that isn't worth your time or money." Ian Cohen, writing for Pitchfork, commended the first third for its lyrical boasts, criticized the middle portion's "one dimensionality" and "woefully underdeveloped" party jams and found the final half's hip-hop checklist tracks passable if the listeners can stomach the logic behind them, saying that "[W]hile Theater isn't quite as dire as the above may indicate, like every other Ludacris record, it doesn't grow on you-- in fact, it actually contracts."

Chart performance
The album debuted at number five on the Billboard 200, selling 214,000 copies in its first week, making it his sixth top 5 album on that chart. It was his first album since 2000's Back for the First Time and 2001's Word of Mouf to not reach number one status, and his lowest charting album in his career. As of March 2010, the album has sold about 671,000 copies, achieving a gold certification.

Track listing

Sample credits
 "Undisputed" contains samples of "We'll Find a Way" performed by Edwin Starr.
 "One More Drink" contains samples of "Take That To The Bank" performed by Shalamar.
 "Everybody Hates Chris" contains samples of "It Takes a Whole Lotta Man for a Woman Like Me" performed by Gladys Knight & the Pips.
 "Last of a Dying Breed" contains samples of "You Don't Have to Say You Love Me" performed by Dusty Springfield, and "Eric B. Is President" performed by Eric B. & Rakim.
 "MVP" contains samples of "Virgo" performed by Nas, "DTP for Life" performed by Disturbing tha Peace, and "All Night Long" performed by Mary Jane Girls.
 "Do the Right Thang" contains samples of "Na Boca Do Sol" performed by Arthur Verocai.
 "Let's Stay Together" contains samples of "Everybody's Breakin' Up" performed by Billy Paul.

Personnel
Credits for Theater of the Mind adapted from AllMusic.

 Joseph Alexander – keyboards
 Wayne Allison – engineer
 Chris Atlas – marketing
 Ken Bailey – A&R
 Christian Baker – engineer
 Dru Betts – vocals
 Leslie Brathwaite – mixing
 Don Cannon – engineer, score
 Andrew Coleman – engineer
 Jeff Dixon – executive producer
 DJ Premier – score
 Mike Donaldson – editing
 8TRIX – score
 Jose "Zeek" Fendrick – A&R
 Zach Fisher – engineer
 Morgan Garcia – engineer
 Sean Garrett – score
 Kamau Georges – background vocals, mixing, score
 Jason Goldstein – mixing
 Don Goodrick – assistant
 Inaam Haq – engineer
 Artemus Jenkins – video director
 Eric Jensen – engineer
 Rodney Jerkins – score
 E. Jones – keyboards, keyboard arrangements
 Terese Joseph – A&R
 Doug Joswick – package production
 Gimel "Young Guru" Katon – mixing
 Erik Madrid – assistant
 Brandon Pena – mixing
 Mike Miller – assistant
 Aiyisha Obafemi Mitchell – marketing
 Nick Nastasi – assistant
 Rich Nice – A&R
 9th Wonder – keyboard arrangements
 Erica Novich – A&R
 Dave Pensado – mixing
 Christian Plata – assistant
 Poke & Tone – drums
 Will Ragland – art direction, design
 Orlando Rashid – engineer
 Charles Roane – mixing
 J. Peter Robinson – art direction, design
 The Runners – score
 Glenn Schick – mastering
 Derrick Selby – engineer
 Clinton Sparks – score
 Chris Stanford – photography
 Scott Storch – score
 Crystal Streets – stylist
 Swizz Beatz – score
 Neo Tanusakdi – engineer
 Sean Taylor – A&R
 Justin Trawick – assistant
 Javier Valverde – engineer
 Miles Walker – engineer
 Brian Warwick – engineer
 Finis "KY" White – engineer
 Mike "Hitman" Wilson – engineer
 Wyldfyre – score
 Keke and Amy — production coordination
 Mayne Zane – background vocals
 Chaka Zulu – executive producer

Release dates

Charts

Weekly charts

Year-end charts

Certifications

References

Ludacris albums
2008 albums
Albums produced by 9th Wonder
Albums produced by DJ Premier
Albums produced by DJ Toomp
Albums produced by Don Cannon
Albums produced by Dre & Vidal
Albums produced by Rodney Jerkins
Albums produced by Scott Storch
Albums produced by Sean Garrett
Albums produced by Swizz Beatz
Albums produced by the Runners
Albums produced by Trackmasters
Concept albums
Def Jam Recordings albums
Disturbing tha Peace albums